Sir Peter George Snell  (17 December 1938 – 12 December 2019) was a New Zealand middle-distance runner. He won three Olympic gold medals, and is the only man since 1920 to have won the 800 and 1500 metres at the same Olympics, in 1964.

Snell had a relatively short career as a world-famous international sportsman, 1960–1965, yet achieved so much that he was voted New Zealand's "Sports Champion of the (20th) Century" and was one of 24 inaugural members of the International Association of Athletics Federations Hall of Fame named in 2012. A protégé of the New Zealand athletics coach Arthur Lydiard, Snell is known for the three Olympic and two Commonwealth Games gold medals he won, and the several world records he set.

Early athletic career 
Born in Ōpunake, Snell moved with his family to Waikato in 1949 where he attended Te Aroha College and became an all-around sportsman. He won several middle-distance running events in his hometown of Te Aroha, although some members of his new school lived in Ngāruawāhia. He attended Mount Albert Grammar School in Auckland, where he took up a wide range of team and individual sports, including rugby union, cricket, tennis, badminton, and golf. As a teenager, Snell excelled in tennis, and pursued the sport through appearances at the Auckland and New Zealand Junior Tennis Championships.

At age 19, Snell was motivated to concentrate seriously on running by the comments of his future coach, Arthur Lydiard, who told him, "Peter, with the sort of speed you've got, if you do the endurance training, you could be one of our best middle-distance runners." During his early career under the tutelage of Lydiard, he started with New Zealand titles and records for 880 yards and the mile, despite being an unusually large and powerful man by typical middle-distance runner standards.

Olympic success 
Snell came to international attention with his gold medal in the 800 metres at the Rome Olympics in 1960, setting a new national record.

By winning the 800–1500 m double, Snell became the only male to achieve this feat at the Olympics since 1920, and it has not been achieved by any male athlete at the Olympics since. It was not achieved by a male at an open global championship until Moroccan-born Rashid Ramzi of Bahrain won both golds at the World Championships in 2005 at Helsinki. (After the 2008 Olympic Games, Ramzi was stripped of his Olympic gold medal for doping, but that penalty was not applied retroactively to his World Championship gold medals.)

World records 
In all, Snell set five individual world records and joined fellow New Zealand athletes to set a new four by one mile relay record as well.

Snell's former world records of 1:44.3 for 800 m (3 February 1962) and 2:16.6 for 1000 m (12 November 1964), remain the New Zealand national records for these distances. His 800 m record remains the fastest ever run over that distance on a grass track, and is also the oldest national record recognized by the IAAF for a standard track and field event.  His 800 m record was also the Oceania continental area record for 56 years, until 20 July 2018.

Fatigued after his Olympic buildup and second world mile record in 1964, his final track season in 1965 was characterized by a string of losses to such athletes as Olympic 1500 m silver medalist Josef Odlozil, Olympic 800 m silver medalist Bill Crothers, U.S. high schooler and future world record holder Jim Ryun, and the American Jim Grelle. Snell then announced his retirement.

Career after retirement from sport 
Snell worked for a tobacco company before moving to the United States of America in 1971 to further his education. He gained a B.S. in human performance from the University of California, Davis, and then a PhD in exercise physiology from Washington State University. He joined University of Texas Southwestern Medical Center at Dallas as a research fellow in 1981. He was associate professor, Department of Internal Medicine and also director of their Human Performance Center. A member of the American College of Sports Medicine, Snell was honoured in 1999 as an Inaugural Inductee, International Scholar, into the Athlete Hall of Fame, University of Rhode Island.

Adopting a new sport, Snell became an active orienteer and won his category, men aged 65 and older, in the 2003 United States Orienteering Championship. He was a past president of the North Texas Orienteering Association and a member of the United States Orienteering Federation.

Snell also became a competitive table tennis player including competing in Texas state (finishing in the top 4 in the 75+ age category) and U.S. championship events and also the 2017 World Masters Games in Auckland, New Zealand.

Snell died at his home in Dallas on 12 December 2019, just five days short of turning 81. The cause was heart failure. Miki, his wife, survived him.

Commemorations and awards

Following his success at the Perth Commonwealth Games in 1962, Snell was appointed a Member of the Order of the British Empire for services in the field of athletics in the 1962 Queen's Birthday Honours. Three years later he was elevated to Officer of the same order in the 1965 New Year Honours.

He was voted New Zealand's Sports Champion of the Century in 2000 and was knighted soon afterwards. In the 2002 New Year Honours, he was appointed a Distinguished Companion of the New Zealand Order of Merit for services to sport, and in 2009, following the restoration of titular honours by the New Zealand government, he accepted redesignation as a Knight Companion of the New Zealand Order of Merit and was invested by the Governor-General of New Zealand, Sir Anand Satyanand.

Snell was one of five Olympic athletes from New Zealand featured on a series of commemorative postage stamps issued in August 2004 to commemorate the 2004 Olympic Games. The two dollar stamp issued by New Zealand Post features a stylized photo of Snell snapping the tape at the finish line of the 800 metres race at the 1960 Olympics in Rome.

He was selected by Track and Field News''' as their "Athlete of the '60's" and was pictured on the cover of the December 1969 issue.
In 2007 he was awarded an honorary doctorate (DSc) by Massey University in recognition of his work as an exercise physiologist.

A larger than life-size bronze statue of Peter Snell was erected in his hometown of Ōpunake, Taranaki, and was unveiled on 19 May 2007. The statue is based on a photo of Snell crossing the finish line in the historic race at Wanganui's Cook's Gardens in 1962. A similar bronze statue of Snell was unveiled in Cook's Gardens on 15 August 2009 to commemorate his athletic achievements.

Interviewed by the Wanganui Chronicle after the unveiling, Snell said he was internationally known as a miler, but he had never reached his potential over the mile and the 800 metres was probably his best distance. He said his greatest effort was the world 800m/880yard double record set on Lancaster Park a few days after his new mile record, with an 800m time that would have won the gold medal 46 years later at the Beijing Olympics.

Snell was inducted into the Taranaki Sports Hall of Fame at the Taranaki Sports Awards 2021.

Honorific eponyms
In 2001, Macleans College in Auckland created Snell House as part of its "whanau house" system.

The Peter Snell Youth Village, on the Whangaparaoa Peninsula, in North Auckland, New Zealand, is also named after him. They run holiday camps for young people.

Snell Drive, in the Hamilton suburb of Chartwell, is named in Snell's honour.

Peter Snell Street is a street in the Bay of Plenty town of Whakatane.

Personal bests

See also
 

Notes
  En route in the 3:54.1 mile.

References
Cited references

General references

 Snell, Peter and Gilmour, Garth (1965).  No Bugles, No Drums''.  Auckland: Minerva.

External links

 Page with Photo, one of two at Sporting Heroes
 Peter Snell – Athlete – A documentary made in 1964 available to view on NZ On Screen
 

|-

1938 births
2019 deaths
Knights Companion of the New Zealand Order of Merit
New Zealand Officers of the Order of the British Empire
People in sports awarded knighthoods
New Zealand male middle-distance runners
Olympic athletes of New Zealand
Olympic gold medalists for New Zealand
Athletes (track and field) at the 1960 Summer Olympics
Athletes (track and field) at the 1964 Summer Olympics
Athletes (track and field) at the 1962 British Empire and Commonwealth Games
Commonwealth Games gold medallists for New Zealand
New Zealand emigrants to the United States
New Zealand orienteers
Male orienteers
World record setters in athletics (track and field)
University of California, Davis alumni
People from Ōpunake
Sportspeople from Te Aroha
People educated at Mount Albert Grammar School
Commonwealth Games medallists in athletics
Exercise physiologists
Medalists at the 1964 Summer Olympics
Medalists at the 1960 Summer Olympics
Olympic gold medalists in athletics (track and field)
American orienteers
Track & Field News Athlete of the Year winners
Medallists at the 1962 British Empire and Commonwealth Games